On-off or Onoff may refer to:
 On-off control, a type of feedback controller
 On-off keying, a type of line modulation
 On-off relationship, a form of personal relationship
 On-Off Singles, a type of tennis game
 On-off switch, a type of electric switch
 Onoff (retailer), an electronics retailer in Estonia, formerly also active in Sweden and Finland

Music
 Onoff (Irish band), an Irish punk-rock band
 On/Off (Japanese band), a Japanese j-pop band
 On/Off (ONF EP), 2017
 On/Off (Run On EP), 1995
 On-Off (album), a 2006 album by Marcin Rozynek

See also 
 On and Off (disambiguation)
 "Off & On", a song by Sophie Ellis-Bextor
 OffOn, a film by Scott Bartlett